Arthur Robins (1888 – 12 March 1924) was an English footballer who played as an Outside right for Sheffield United in the Football League.

Career
Born in Northampton Robins begun his career at Raunds St Peters before transferring to The Blades in 1910. He was a regular for the reserves whilst at Bramall Lane but failed to make the breakthrough into the first team, making only a handful of appearances.

After being released by United he moved to Castleford Town, becoming player manager from 1911. With the outset of World War I and with Castleford dissolved for the duration he made a number of wartime guest appearances back at Sheffield United as well as appearing for Goole Town and Luton Town.

Following the war he returned to the re-formed Castleford Town in 1919 where he played a further season as player manager before retiring from playing in 1920 to remain as manager until his death in 1924.

References

1888 births
1924 deaths
Footballers from Northampton
English footballers
English Football League players
Association football forwards
Sheffield United F.C. players
Castleford Town F.C. players
Luton Town F.C. players
Goole Town F.C. players